Dothideomycetidae is a subclass of Dothideomycetes consisting of three orders: Dothideales, Myriangiales and Capnodiales. The cavities of the sexual structures do not have vertical cells (paraphyses, pseudoparaphyses or paraphysoids) growing between the sac-like cells bearing the sexual spores (asci).

References

Dothideomycetes
Fungus subclasses
Lichen subclasses